Norman Rockwell's World... An American Dream is a 1972 short documentary film about artist Norman Rockwell produced by Richard Barclay and directed by Robert Deubel. The film won an Oscar at the 45th Academy Awards, held in 1973, for Best Short Subject. Barclay, being the producer, was the recipient of the Oscar.

Summary
With commentary by Rockwell himself, it examines the vision and essence of the artist through still photos, archival film footage and paintings to capture the hopes, dreams and minimalism of the American people.

Cast
 Norman Rockwell
 Robert Deubel 
 Gaby Monet

See also
 Americana
 1972 in film

References

External links

1972 films
1972 short films
1972 documentary films
1970s short documentary films
American short documentary films
Live Action Short Film Academy Award winners
Columbia Pictures short films
Documentary films about painters
Norman Rockwell
1970s English-language films
1970s American films